7-Spiroindanyloxymorphone (SIOM) is a drug that is used in scientific research. It is a selective δ-opioid agonist. It is a derivative of oxymorphone.

References 

4,5-Epoxymorphinans
Opioids
Delta-opioid receptor agonists
Phenols
Tertiary alcohols
Ketones
Spiro compounds